Dalian Minzu University is located in Dalian, Liaoning, People's Republic of China and directly supervised by the State Ethnic Affairs Commission.

History
Dalian Minzu University (former name Dalian Nationalities University) was founded in 1997. As the only Nationalities University focusing on technology and applied science, it has grown very rapidly ever since. It is now one of the leading universities in Northeast China.

Students of DMU have won numerous awards in various scientific and technological competitions, including winning Mathematical Contest in Modeling (MCM) 2005, representing China to compete in Robocup 2007, Winning Microsoft Imagine Cup in China 2008 and Second prize internationally.

Departments
Dalian Minzu University has a good reputation in both engineering and science programs. The university also offers programs in business, economics, arts, and management. It has 40 bachelor's degree programs and 14 colleges, including:
 College of Economics and Management 
 College of Life Science 
 College of Computer Science & Engineering 
 College of Electromechanical and Information Engineering 
 College of Architecture and Civil Engineering 
 College of Liberal Arts & Law 
 College of Mathematics and Physics 
 College of Foreign Languages and Cultures 
 College of Design

Campus
The campus is large and has comprehensive modern teaching and research equipment. Fifteen state and provincial key laboratories have been established one after another throughout the years.

See also
 Minzu University of China

External links
Dalian Minzu University English Official Website

Universities and colleges in Dalian
Educational institutions established in 1997
1997 establishments in China
Minzu Universities